Prince Józef Lubomirski (c.1676–1732) was a Polish noble  (szlachcic).

He was voivode of Chernigov Voivodeship since 1726.

1732 deaths
Jozef Lubomirski
1670s births